Pop Tops (or Los Pop-Tops) were a vocal/instrumental band, formed in 1967 in Madrid, Spain, with Phil Trim from Trinidad and Tobago as lead singer. Their sound was a blend of baroque pop with the soulful vocals of Trim.

Members
Original set-up included
Phil Trim (born January 5, 1940, in Trinidad and Tobago) - lead singer
Julián Luis Angulo - guitar, vocals
Alberto Vega - saxophone, clarinet, vocals
Enrique Gómez - bass, trumpet
Ignacio Pérez - organ, piano
José Lipiani - drums
Ray Gómez - guitar

Some changes occurred in members:

Francisco Urbano Romero - drums (replacing José Lipani)
Rafael Guillermo Gertrudis - keyboards, piano (replacing Ignacio Pérez)

Hits
Their first release to gain attention was "Oh Lord, Why Lord" (1968), written by Jean Marcel Bouchety and Phil Trim. It was the first pop song to incorporate the melody of Pachelbel's Canon in D.  That single's b-side, "The Voice of the Dying Man" (based on a Johann Sebastian Bach composition) was also recorded in Spanish as "La Voz del Hombre Caido".

They are best known for their 1971 hit "Mamy Blue", referring to a son's poignant song addressed to his departed mother about his childhood memories and life in general, sometimes spelled "Mommy Blue", "Mammy Blue" or "Mummy Blue", which was a Top 10 hit throughout much of Europe, Japan (#2), and Canada (#42), and a minor Billboard Hot 100 chart hit in the United States (#57). It was covered in the US by the Stories peaking at No. 50 in 1973.  It sold over one million copies, and was awarded a platinum record.
The composer and lyricist of the French song "Mamy Blue" was Hubert Giraud. English lyrics were written by Phil Trim. The Pop Tops also recorded Italian and Spanish versions, with lyrics by Gefingal.

As follow-up singles they released "Suzanne Suzanne" (early 1972) and "Hideaway" (mid 1972), which were only minor hits in some European countries.

Discography

Albums

Singles

Spanish releases
Barclay, Spain

1967: Con su blanca palidez / I Can't Go On 
1967: Viento to otoño (Autumn Winds) / Cry 
1968: Somewhere / The Voice of the Dying Man (La voz del hombre caido) 
1968: Oh Lord, Why Lord / Beyond the Sea (El mar) 
1968: Oh Lord, Why Lord (in Spanish) / El mar 
1968: Esa mujer (That Woman) / Adagio cardenal
1968: That Woman / The Man I Am Today 
1968: Pepa / Junto a ti 
1969: Dzim-dzim-dzas (Love and Care) / Young and Foolish 
1969: Soñar, bailar y cantar (She's Coming Back) / Anytime

Explosion, Spain
1971: Dios a todos hizo libres (Road to Freedom) / Movimento de amor 
1971: Road to Freedom / Who Will Believe 
1971: Mamy Blue (span.) / Love Motion 
1971: Mamy Blue / Grief and Torture 
1972: Suzanne Suzanne / Happiness Ville 
1972: Suzanne Suzanne (in Spanish) / Walk along by the Riverside 
1972: Hideaway / What a Place to Live In 
1973: My Little Woman / Girl, What's on Your Mind? 
1973: Happy, Hippy, Youppy Song / Where Can I Go 
1973: Happy, Hippy, Youppy Song (in Spanish) / Angeline 
1974: What a Way to Go / Baby I Will Cry

German releases
Bellaphon, West Germany

1971: Mamy Blue / Road to Freedom 
1971: Oh Lord, Why Lord / Walk Along by the Riverside (Remake)
1972: Suzanne Suzanne / Happiness Ville 
1972: Hideaway / What a Place to Live In 
1973: My Little Woman / Girl, What's on Your Mind? 
1973: Happy, Hippy, Youppy Song / Where Can I Go 
1973: What a Way to Go / Baby I Will Cry

References

Spanish musical groups
Musical groups established in 1967